The Grebo or Glebo people are an ethnic group or subgroup within the larger Kru group of Africa, a language and cultural ethnicity, and to certain of its constituent elements. Within Liberia members of this group are found primarily in Maryland County and Grand Kru County in the southeastern portion of the country, but also in River Gee County and Sinoe County.  The Grebo population in Côte d'Ivoire are known as the Krumen and are found in the southwestern corner of that country.

A 2001 estimate of the number of Grebo people in Liberia is approximately 387,000. There are an estimated 48,300 Grebo in Côte d'Ivoire, not counting refugees. Precise numbers are lacking, since many have been displaced by the civil war in Liberia of the late 20th and early 21st century.

Definition
As early European explorers and Americo-Liberian colonists reached the area of Cape Palmas by sea, the first indigenous group they encountered in the area with whom they established prolonged relations were the Seaside Grebo, or Glebo. The colonists referred to them generally as the Grebo. In the absence of other qualification, the term Grebo has come to refer generally to this group in particular, which has occupied southeastern coastal areas of what is now Liberia.

Considerable ambiguity and imprecision accompany the use of the term Grebo since it is not always clear precisely which group writers or speakers intend to denote. Some of the ambiguity has evolved historically, as the name was generalized from that of the first group contacted by Americo-Liberian colonists in the area that was settled as Maryland County. As colonists used the term to refer to other, lesser-known groups in inland areas, the term became more imprecise, as such groups often belonged to other language families and ethnicities. The confusion has been perpetuated, as Grebo has been used as a cover term for groups in the area that are now known by scholars known to be different but continue to be classified as the same for convenience.

Language

The numerous subgroups of the large and variegated ethnic group, such as the Kru, are defined by linguists referring to a taxonomy of the languages employed by its members. Although there may be archaeological evidence and oral histories, the language classification is often the least confusing frame of reference.

The Grebo ethnic group comprises a community of speakers of speech varieties covering an extensive language continuum punctuated by a collection of cultural centers of gravity, usually town clusters.  While the affinity of these varieties is apparent, the internal structure of a classification is often difficult to delineate with any degree of precision.

History of European (American) contact
The indigenous people living at Cape Palmas, who were speakers of Seaside Grebo (Glebo) (as since classified by linguists) were the first to have extensive contact with the American representatives of the Maryland Colonization Society, which organized the colonization of what became known as  Maryland in Africa by free African Americans, beginning in 1827.

The Glebo gained sociopolitical ascendancy over neighboring groups from this period, due to their access to Western technology and their alliances with the colonists and Americo-Liberians, the ethnic group that formed from their descendants.

Attitudes

In both the historic and prehistoric periods, frequent armed conflict occurred among the various groups covered by the general label Grebo. 

Some inland ethnic groups have longstanding resentment against the Seaside Grebo because of their relationship with the Americo-Liberians, who established dominance because of their relationship to United States groups and trade, as well as advantages of education and technology. First, the inland groups consider the Grebo foolish to have "sold" their traditional lands to the American colonists. Given the influence of the colonial period, the inland groups believe that the Seaside Grebo have allowed their language to become replete with English borrowings, although attempts to control and restrict language have generally been unsuccessful in most regions. Thirdly, in a difference typical between groups that are more or less assimilated in relation to a new people in an area, the inland groups have expressed dismay that the Seaside Grebo abandoned traditional ways to adopt fashions of Liberian or European Americans. For their part, members of the Seaside Grebo have been reported as referring to the up-country groups as "Bush" Grebo, pagan and barbarous.

Since the late 20th century, some of these issues have inspired a pan-Grebo unification sentiment. In its extreme form, it has been part of a political movement to unite virtually all speakers of the sociolinguistic language Grebo in the counties of Maryland, River Gee, and Grand Kru. In its recent form, the movement arose as part of the emergence of "political tribes" (factions) during the civil wars of the late 20th century (First Liberian Civil War and Second Liberian Civil War). They defined themselves against the Americo-Liberian power base. In a sense, this was a continuation of the Grebo wars of the 19th century.

Culture
Traditional Grebo people had what were known as bush schools (poro for males and sande for females); these and their associated societies have continued to be part of the culture. Historically the poro(s) adapted to new condition by establishing Masonic lodges of the European-American style of fraternal society.

Tooth chipping
Before the Euro-American influence became great, members of the group would often chip their teeth to sharp points to create a ferocious visage, as well as for aesthetic reasons.

Ritual artifacts
The Grebo are known for their carved wooden masks, which were worn in ceremonies to mediate or propitiate the spirits.  White clay is applied to participants in certain ceremonies, to denote a ku or spirit. Dancers wearing the carved masks are also , and dancers wearing these masks were daubed with it.

Kings or chiefs often wore a heavy brass ankle ring, which was put on in early life by a blacksmith, and worn to the death.  These anklets were considered animate, and regularly fed human blood.
King's Anklet

Divination
Local adepts practice divination by scrying, and may use the results of such divination to determine the putative perpetrator of a crime.

Trial by ordeal
A person (usually a woman) accused of witchcraft is tried by ordeal for the determination of guilt by being subjected to the forced imbibition of a decoction of the bark of the sasswood (sassywood) tree/vine (Erythrophleum suaveolens or guineense).  If the person dies, they are adjudged guilty.  More often than not they do die, as sasswood is quite poisonous.  According to a Maryland County newspaper, a woman was killed rather recently by this ordeal.

Exogamy
Members of a patrilineal descent group (clan) must find a mate from another clan, under pain of taboo violation.  Virilocal residence is the norm.

Multilingualism
A degree of bilingualism / bidialectalism is normal in such a context, as the needs of exogamy and commercial interaction require it.

Diglossia (extended or not), often with Liberian (Pidgin English), provides an additional dimension to the multilingual complexity described above.

References

Bibliography
Hasselbring, Sue, and Eric Johnson. 2002. A Sociolinguistic Survey of the Grebo Language Area of Liberia.  SIL International Monograph, 100 pages.
Moran, Mary H. 1986. "Collective Action and the 'Representation' of African Women: A Liberian Case Study," "Feminist Studies", 15:443-60.
Moran, Mary H. 1990. "Civilized Women: Gender and Prestige in Southeastern Liberia." Ithaca, NY: Cornell University Press.
Moran, Mary H. 1992. "Civilized Servants: Child Fosterage and Training for Status Among the Glebo of Liberia." In Hansen, Karen T. (ed.) "African Encounters with Domesticity," 98-115. New Brunswick, NJ: Rutgers University Press.
Moran, Mary H. 1995. "Warriors or Soldiers? Masculinity and Ritual Transvestisism in the Liberian Civil war." In Sutton, Constance R. (ed.) "Feminism, Nationalism, and Militarism." Arlington, Va.: American Anthropological Association.
Moran, Mary H. 1996. "Carrying the Queen: Identity and Nationalism in a Liberian Queen Rally. In Cohen, C.B., Stoeltje, B. & R. Wilk (eds.) "Beauty Queens on the Global Stage: Gender, Contests, and Power," 147-60. London: Routledge.
Moran, Mary H. 2000. "Gender and Aging: Are Women "Warriors" Among the Glebo of Liberia?" "Liberian Studies Journal", 25:25-41.
Moran, Mary H. 2006. Liberia: The Violence of Democracy. Philadelphia: University of Pennsylvania Press.

External links
US Navy map of Maryland in Africa, 1853.

 
Ethnic groups in Liberia